The Marijuana Party is a Canadian federal political party, whose agenda focuses on issues related to cannabis in Canada. Apart from this one issue, the party has no other official policies, meaning party candidates are free to express any views on all other political issues. Passage of the Cannabis Act in June 2018 legalized cannabis on 17 October 2018.

Candidates appear on election ballots under the short form "Radical Marijuana" and their status is similar to that of independent candidates. Although governed by the Canada Elections Act, the Marijuana Party is a "decentralized" party, without by-laws, charter or constitution that govern its operations. Its Electoral District Associations are autonomous units of the party as a whole.

History
The party was founded by Marc-Boris St-Maurice in February 2000. In the November 2000 federal election, the party nominated candidates in 73 ridings in seven provinces and won 66,419 votes (0.52% of national popular vote).

In January and May 2004, changes were made to Canada's electoral laws which significantly reduced the fundraising abilities of the Marijuana Party; specifically, the elections law was amended so that most of the Marijuana Party's political contribution tax credit scheme was criminalized. The result of those changes was a very significant drop in the party's funding by 95%. As of 2004, parties with more than two per cent of the national vote were eligible to receive $2 per year per individual vote, as well as have the majority of their election expenses refunded. Small parties unable to secure two per cent of the vote do not qualify for any subsidy from votes or for election expenses. In the June 2004 federal election, the party nominated 71 candidates, but won only 33,590 votes (0.25% of the national popular vote).

On February 28, 2005, founder St-Maurice announced his intention to join the Liberal Party in order to work for liberalized marijuana laws from within the governing party. Many former Marijuana Party members have joined one of the mainstream political parties (NDP, Liberal, Conservative, or Green) in order to push for reform from within. In 2005, Elections Canada recognized Blair T. Longley as the new party leader following St-Maurice's resignation.

In the January 2006 federal election, the party ran candidates in 23 ridings and received 9,275 votes (0.06% of the national popular vote). In the Nunavut riding, however, the party's candidate won 7.88% of all ballots cast and finished in fourth place, ahead of the Greens.

Criticisms of Canada's legalisation (2018–present)

In June 2018, the party's leader, Blair Longley, addressed concerns about Canada's cannabis legalisation plans, referring to it as ‘prohibition 2.0’. Referring to Canada’s legalisation plans he said “There’s this slight bit of progress, but when you look at the bigger picture, it’s nothing close to what we would want.” He said that “Legalisation is great if you’re rich and old and have your own house and can afford to buy expensive marijuana. But if you’re still young and poor and don’t own your own house, it’s worse than it was before.” In relation to this Longley brought up some of the varying restrictions across the country, such as landlords in Nova Scotia being granted permission to ban cannabis use and cultivation on their properties and Calgary’s city council passing a bylaw prohibiting pot consumption in public. Another issue he brought up concerned people's limit to only being able to grow up to four marijuana plants per household, while people can brew as much beer and wine as they want and grow up to 15 kg of tobacco.

Other concerns about Canada's marijuana legalisation include, tough penalties for those who break drug laws, such as prison sentences of up to 14 years for providing marijuana to a minor or selling it without a license. There are also concerns about restricting sales to government-run monopolies, which favours large producers and makes it very difficult for small businesses in the market. Critics have concerns about the stake of producers and private companies, such as owning patents to names and genetic strains. Longely has been referred to as "skeptical about the quality of the bud commercial producers are putting to market" and has said that there is an opportunity for the black market to offer better quality marijuana at lower prices.

Since the announcement of Canada's legalisation plans Longley said the party is being run on a "broken shoestring budget" and is getting "more and more broken and shorter and shorter all the time" and questioned whether the party would be able to remain registered. The party needs 250 members' signatures so it can be registered with Elections Canada.

Election results

Leaders
 Marc-Boris St-Maurice (2000–2004)
 Blair Longley (2004–present)

Provincial parties
In addition to the Bloc Pot party in Quebec, the Marijuana Party has several separate provincial counterparts, most notably, the British Columbia Marijuana Party which received over 3% of the vote in the 2001 provincial election, and the Marijuana Party of Nova Scotia. The Bloc Pot and the federal Marijuana Party work together; however, the BC Marijuana Party and the federal Marijuana Party do not work together as the BC Party Marijuana decided to direct their activism into mainstream political parties.

See also 

 Cannabis in Canada
 Drug policy reform
 Legal issues of cannabis
 Marijuana Party candidates in the 2000 Canadian federal election
 Marijuana Party candidates in the 2004 Canadian federal election
 Marijuana Party candidates in the 2006 Canadian federal election
 Marijuana Party candidates in the 2008 Canadian federal election
 Marijuana Party candidates in the 2011 Canadian federal election
 Marijuana parties

References

External links

Marijuana Party - Canadian Political Parties and Political Interest Groups - Web Archive created by the University of Toronto Libraries

2000 in cannabis
Cannabis political parties of Canada
Federal political parties in Canada
Political parties established in 2000
Single-issue political parties in Canada